A total of fourteen women have served as the first minister of a Canadian government. Of these, one was prime minister of the country, nine were premiers of a province and four were premiers of a territory. Three are currently in office.

Women have been eligible to become premier since they first gained the right to vote, beginning in 1916 in Manitoba and extending to all jurisdictions when Quebec allowed women to vote in 1940 (the Northwest Territories did not allow women to vote until later, but it did not have premiers at the time). Women soon began to be appointed to cabinet positions, starting with Mary Ellen Smith in British Columbia in 1921, but it was not until decades later that women began to serve as leaders of a major party. Hilda Watson became the first woman to lead her party to victory in a general election in 1978. However, since Yukon did not have premiers at the time, and Watson did not win her riding, her successor became the first Government Leader of the Yukon. The first female premier was Rita Johnston in 1991 in British Columbia. Today, every Canadian jurisdiction has had at least one female premier except for Nova Scotia, New Brunswick, and Saskatchewan.

The most female first ministers at any one time was six, for 277 days from 11 February to 15 November 2013. These six included the premiers of Canada's four most populated provinces, so during that time approximately 88% of Canadians had a female premier. The longest-serving female premier is Christy Clark, who served as premier of British Columbia for over six years, from 14 March 2011 to 18 July 2017.

Three of the thirteen female premiers won the title by defeating an incumbent premier in a general election, and another three earned their positions through consensus government systems that lack political parties. The rest won the title through a party leadership race, although several then went on to win a general election as the incumbent premier.  No female premier in Canadian history has ever been re-elected to form government.  Out of all of the female premiers that have won an election and went on to form government, none of them were re-elected, that is, not one succeeded in being returned to office. Christy Clark won the 2013 BC election and she led her party to win the most seats in the 2017 election, but she was not successful in forming government as the BC Liberals were defeated in a confidence vote shortly after.

There are currently three female first ministers in Canada Caroline Cochrane (13th Premier of the Northwest Territories), who assumed office on 24 October 2019, Heather Stefanson (24th Premier of Manitoba), who assumed office on 2 November 2021, and Danielle Smith (19th Premier of Alberta) who assumed office on 11 October 2022.

Timeline of female first ministers

See also
Women in Canadian politics
List of Canadian women government ministers
List of vicereines in Canada
List of elected or appointed female heads of state
List of Asian-Canadian first ministers
List of female prime ministers

References

First ministers
 
Female
Canada